Aliyah is the immigration of Jews to the Land of Israel.

Aliyah may also refer to:

Film and television
 Aliyah (2012 film), a French film
 Aliyah (2018 film), a Manipuri film
 "Aliyah" (NCIS), the 25th episode of the sixth season of the CBS network show NCIS

Other uses
 Aliyah (political party), a now-defunct political party in Israel during the 14th Knesset
 Aliyah (given name)
 Aliyah (Torah), being called up to recite a blessing or read from a portion of the Torah
 Aliyah (wrestler) (born 1994), a Canadian wrestler

See also
 Aaliyah (1979–2001), American singer, actress and model
 Aaliyah (disambiguation)
 Alijah Vera-Tucker (born 1999), American football player
 Aliya (disambiguation)
 Alia (disambiguation)
 Alya (disambiguation)